Philippe Lando Rossignol, was a soukous recording artist and vocalist, in the Democratic Republic of the Congo (DRC). He was once a member of the soukous band TPOK Jazz, led by François Luambo Makiadi, which dominated the Congolese music scene from the 1950s through the 1980s. Rossignol was one of the founding members of the group in 1956. He quit the band in 1957. Rossignol died on 24 June 2004.

See also
 Franco Luambo Makiadi
 Sam Mangwana
 Josky Kiambukuta
 Simaro Lutumba
 Ndombe Opetum
 Youlou Mabiala
 Mose Fan Fan
 Koffi Olomide
 Wuta Mayi
 TPOK Jazz
 List of African musicians

References

External links
 Overview of Composition of TPOK Jazz

Democratic Republic of the Congo musicians
Soukous musicians
TPOK Jazz members